This is a list of the first minority male lawyer(s) and judge(s) in Wisconsin. It includes the year in which the men were admitted to practice law (in parentheses). Also included are men who achieved other distinctions such becoming the first in their state to graduate from law school or become a political figure.

Firsts in Wisconsin's history

Lawyers 

First African American male: Everett E. Simpson (1888) 
First African American male to argue a case before the  Wisconsin Supreme Court: William T. Green (1892) 
First Native American (Oneida) male: Dennison Wheelock (1911)  
First Native American male admitted to state bar: Thomas "Ted" St. Germaine (1932)

State judges 

First African American male to run for judicial seat: Andrew R. Reneau in 1955 
First African American male: Harold Jackson Jr. in 1972 
First Hispanic American male: Ness Flores in 1978 
First male judge (who is deaf) to use a computerized transcription system in a Wisconsin court: Richard S. Brown in 1983
First African American male elected without being appointed by a governor: Carl Ashley in 1999
First Latino American male elected to the circuit court without being appointed by a governor: Ralph Ramirez around 1999 
First African American male (Wisconsin Court of Appeals): Paul B. Higginbotham (1985) in 2003 
First Asian American male (Japanese ancestry): Glenn H. Yamahiro (1991) in 2003 
 First African American male (Wisconsin Supreme Court): Louis B. Butler (1977) in 2004

Federal judges 
 First African American male (U.S. Bankruptcy Court in Wisconsin): Charles N. Clevert Jr. (1972) in 1977
 First African American male (U.S. District Court for the Eastern District of Wisconsin): Charles N. Clevert Jr. (1972) in 1995

Assistant United States Attorney 

 First African American male: Grady L. Pettigrew, Jr. in 1975

District Attorney 

 First African American male: Ismael Ozanne in 2010

Assistant District Attorney 

 First African American male: Andrew R. Reneau

Firsts in local history 

 Daniel Bernstine: First African American male to serve as the Dean of University of Wisconsin Law School (1990)
 Paul B. Higginbotham: First African American judge in Dane County, Wisconsin (1994). He was also the first African American municipal court judge in Madison, Wisconsin (1992).
 Juan Colas: First Hispanic American male judge in Dane County, Wisconsin (2008)
 Ismael Ozanne: First African American male to serve as the District Attorney of Dane County, Wisconsin (2010)
 Casimir Gonski (1893): First Polish lawyer in Milwaukee, Milwaukee County, Wisconsin
 William T. Green (1892): First African American male lawyer in Milwaukee, Wisconsin [Milwaukee County, Wisconsin]
 Harold B. Jackson, Jr.: First African American male to serve as the Assistant District Attorney of Milwaukee County, Wisconsin
 Clarence Parrish: First African American male to win a judicial seat in Milwaukee County, Wisconsin (1981)
 Brett Blomme: First openly LGBT male to win a judicial seat in  Milwaukee County, Wisconsin (2020)
 Ralph Ramirez: First Hispanic American male elected as a circuit court judge in Waukesha County, Wisconsin

See also 

 List of first minority male lawyers and judges in the United States

Other topics of interest 

 List of first women lawyers and judges in the United States
 List of first women lawyers and judges in Wisconsin

References 

 
Minority, Wisconsin, first
Minority, Wisconsin, first
Lawyers, Minority, first
Legal history of Wisconsin
Wisconsin lawyers